The men's double regu sepak takraw competition at the 2014 Asian Games in Incheon was held from 20 September to 22 September at the Bucheon Gymnasium.

Squads

Results 
All times are Korea Standard Time (UTC+09:00)

Preliminary

Group A

|-
|20 September||09:00
|align=right|
|align=center|1–2
|align=left|
|21–18||16–21||7–21
|-
|20 September||09:00
|align=right|
|align=center|2–0
|align=left|
|21–14||21–7||
|-
|20 September||14:00
|align=right|
|align=center|2–0
|align=left|
|21–6||21–6||
|-
|20 September||14:00
|align=right|
|align=center|0–2
|align=left|
|11–21||6–21||
|-
|21 September||09:00
|align=right|
|align=center|0–2
|align=left|
|4–21||9–21||
|-
|21 September||09:00
|align=right|
|align=center|2–1
|align=left|
|19–21||21–14||25–23
|-

Group B

|-
|20 September||11:00
|align=right|
|align=center|2–1
|align=left|
|21–18||21–23||21–17
|-
|20 September||11:00
|align=right|
|align=center|0–2
|align=left|
|16–21||17–21||
|-
|20 September||16:00
|align=right|
|align=center|2–0
|align=left|
|21–11||21–16||
|-
|20 September||16:00
|align=right|
|align=center|2–0
|align=left|
|21–19||21–17||
|-
|21 September||11:00
|align=right|
|align=center|2–0
|align=left|
|21–19||22–20||
|-
|21 September||11:00
|align=right|
|align=center|2–0
|align=left|
|21–15||21–16||
|-

Knockout round

Semifinals

|-
|21 September||14:00
|align=right|
|align=center|2–0
|align=left|
|colspan=3|Walkover
|-
|21 September||14:00
|align=right|
|align=center|2–0
|align=left|
|21–13||21–17||
|-

 Laos was disqualified for failing to show up in their match against South Korea. Singapore was awarded bronze as they were the fifth-best team after the group stage.

Gold medal match

|-
|22 September||11:00
|align=right|
|align=center|0–2
|align=left|
|19–21||18–21||
|-

References

External links
 Official website

Sepak takraw at the 2014 Asian Games